Melphina is a genus of skipper butterflies in the family Hesperiidae.

Species
Melphina evansi Berger, 1974
Melphina flavina Lindsey & Miller, 1965
Melphina hulstaerti Berger, 1974
Melphina malthina (Hewitson, 1876)
Melphina maximiliani Belcastro & Larsen, 2005
Melphina melphis (Holland, 1894)
Melphina noctula (Druce, 1909)
Melphina statira (Mabille, 1891)
Melphina statirides (Holland, 1896)
Melphina tarace (Mabille, 1891)
Melphina unistriga (Holland, 1893)

References

External links
Natural History Museum Lepidoptera genus database
Seitz, A. Die Gross-Schmetterlinge der Erde 13: Die Afrikanischen Tagfalter. Plate XIII 78 h

Erionotini
Hesperiidae genera
Taxa named by William Harry Evans